Alfred Creek, at one time known as Glacier Creek, is a creek flowing off the east flank of Mount Alfred, southeast into the lower reaches of the Skwawka River near its mouth into the head of Jervis Inlet, which is on the South Coast of British Columbia, Canada.

Name origin
The name is derived from that of Mount Alfred, which was named in 1860 after the second son of Queen Victoria and Prince Albert, and Duke of Edinburgh from his birth in 1844 until his death in 1900.

Alfred Creek Falls
Alfred Creek Falls is a waterfall which cascades  down the steep western face of Mount Alfred.

See also
List of waterfalls in Canada
List of rivers in British Columbia
Deserted River Falls

References

Waterfalls of British Columbia
Rivers of the Pacific Ranges
South Coast of British Columbia
Cascade waterfalls
New Westminster Land District